Thích Huyền Quang (19 September 1919 – 5 July 2008) was a Vietnamese Buddhist monk,  dissident and activist. At the time, he was the Patriarch of the Unified Buddhist Church of Vietnam, a currently banned organisation in his homeland. He was notable for his activism for human and religious rights in Vietnam.

In 1977, Quang wrote a letter to then-Prime Minister Phạm Văn Đồng detailing counts of oppression by the communist regime. For this, he and five other senior monks were arrested and detained. In 1982, he was arrested and put on permanent house arrest for opposition to governmental policy after publicly denouncing the establishment of the state-controlled Vietnam Buddhist Sangha.

In 2002, he was awarded the Homo Homini Award for his human rights activism by the Czech group People in Need, which he shared with Thích Quảng Độ and Father Nguyễn Văn Lý.

Death 
Quang died peacefully on Saturday, 5 July 2008, aged 88, at his monastery. His funeral was held on Friday, 11 July 2008, without incident.

References

External links 
The Times obituary for Thích Huyền Quang

1919 births
2008 deaths
Vietnamese Buddhist monks
Vietnamese religious leaders
Civil rights activists
Unified Buddhist Church Buddhists
Vietnamese democracy activists
Vietnamese human rights activists
Vietnamese prisoners and detainees
Vietnamese anti-communists
Vietnamese Zen Buddhists
Buddhist pacifists
People from Bắc Ninh province
20th-century Buddhist monks